Philadelphia is a city in and the county seat of Neshoba County, Mississippi, United States. The population was 7,118 at the 2020 census.

History 

Philadelphia is incorporated as a municipality; it was given its current name, after Philadelphia, Pennsylvania, in 1903, two years before the railroad brought new opportunities and prosperity to the town. The history of the town and its influences- social, political and economic- can be seen in the many points of interest within and beyond the city limits.  These range from the large ceremonial Indian mound and cave at Nanih Waiya, built approximately 1700 years ago and sacred to the Choctaw; to the still thriving Williams Brothers Store, a true old-fashioned general store founded in 1907 and featured in National Geographic in 1937 as a source of anything from "horse collars to straw hats."

Murders of Chaney, Goodman, and Schwerner

In the mid-20th century, Mississippi was a battleground of the civil rights movement as, like other states of the South, it had long disfranchised blacks and subjected them to racial segregation and Jim Crow laws. Philadelphia in June 1964 was the scene of the murders of civil rights workers James Chaney, a 21-year-old black man from Meridian, Mississippi; Andrew Goodman, a 20-year-old Jewish anthropology student from New York City; and Michael Schwerner, a 24-year-old Jewish CORE organizer and former social worker, also from New York. Their deaths demonstrated the risks that civil rights workers took to secure the constitutional rights of African Americans.

Ku Klux Klan members (including Cecil Price, a deputy sheriff of Neshoba County) released the three young men from jail, took them to an isolated spot, and killed them, then buried them in an earthen dam. It was some time after they disappeared before the bodies were discovered, as a result of an FBI investigation and national media attention. The national outrage over their deaths helped procure support for Congressional passage of the Civil Rights Act of 1964 and the Voting Rights Act of 1965.  The murders and related conspiracy gave rise to the "Mississippi Burning" trial, United States v. Price.

Reagan's visit

On August 3, 1980, Ronald Reagan gave his first post-convention speech at the Neshoba County Fair after being officially chosen as the Republican nominee for President of the United States. He said: "I believe in states' rights ... I believe we have distorted the balance of our government today by giving powers that were never intended to be given in the Constitution to that federal establishment." He went on to promise to "restore to states and local governments the power that properly belongs to them".

Dupree's record breaker
Marcus Dupree played high school football for the Philadelphia High School Tornadoes from 1978 to 1981. He was an outstanding athlete who was widely recognized for his achievements. Dupree scored 87 touchdowns total during his playing time in high school, breaking the record set by Herschel Walker by one. In 1981, Marcus's final High School football game was played at Warriors Stadium of the tribal high school at the Choctaw Indian Reservation. The author Willie Morris described the audience at Dupree's final high school game as "the most distinctive crowd I had ever seen ... four thousand or so people seemed almost an equal of mix of whites, blacks, and Indians ... "

First black mayor
In May 2009, Philadelphia elected its first black mayor, James A. Young, a 53-year-old Pentecostal preacher and a former county supervisor. He defeated Rayburn Waddell, a white, three-term incumbent, by 46 votes in the Democratic primary (there was no Republican challenger). Jim Prince, publisher of the local The Neshoba Democrat newspaper said, "Philadelphia will always be connected to what happened here in 1964, but the fact that Philadelphia, Mississippi, with its notorious past, could elect a black man as mayor, it might be time to quit picking on Philadelphia, Mississippi."  Young's campaign staff credited Barack Obama's presidential campaign for increasing registration of black and young voters in Philadelphia, many of whom voted for Young. His term began July 3, 2009.

2011 Tornado

On April 27, 2011, the town and surrounding areas were ravaged during the 2011 Super Outbreak when an EF5 tornado with winds of up to 205 MPH carved a path through town. Despite its incredible strength at the top of the Enhanced-Fujita Scale, only three people died as a result. It would be one of four EF5 tornadoes to strike on that day, and one of two in the state of Mississippi (the town of Smithville further north was decimated a short while later). It also became the first F5/EF5 tornado to strike in Mississippi in 45 years.

Past Mayors

Geography
Philadelphia is located at  (32.774070, -89.112891).

Demographics

2020 census

As of the 2020 United States Census, there were 7,118 people, 2,836 households, and 1,804 families residing in the city.

2000 census
As of the census of 2000, there were 7,303 people, 2,950 households, and 1,899 families residing in the city. The population density was 688.1 people per square mile (265.8/km). There were 3,302 housing units at an average density of 311.1 per square mile (120.2/km). The racial makeup of the city was 55.54% White, 40.12% African American, 2.01% Native American, 0.49% Asian, 0.08% Pacific Islander, 0.55% from other races, and 1.20% from two or more races. Hispanic or Latino were 1.51% of the population.

There were 2,950 households, out of which 30.4% had children under the age of 18 living with them, 40.8% were married couples living together, 20.4% had a female householder with no husband present, and 35.6% were non-families. 32.5% of all households were made up of individuals, and 15.2% had someone living alone who was 65 years of age or older. The average household size was 2.38 and the average family size was 3.00.

In the city, the population was spread out, with 26.1% under the age of 18, 9.1% from 18 to 24, 25.9% from 25 to 44, 21.0% from 45 to 64, and 17.8% who were 65 years of age or older. The median age was 36 years. For every 100 females, there were 81.4 males. For every 100 females age 18 and over, there were 73.8 males.

The median income for a household in the city was $26,438, and the median income for a family was $30,756. Males had a median income of $30,731 versus $20,735 for females. The per capita income for the city was $15,787. About 25.1% of families and 28.1% of the population were below the poverty line, including 41.1% of those under age 18 and 16.4% of those age 65 or over.

Arts and culture

Museums and other points of interest
Geyser Falls Water Theme Park
Silver Star Casino
Neshoba County Fair
Choctaw Indian Fair
Philadelphia-Neshoba County Museum
Marty Stuart Congress of Country Music

Education

Most of the City of Philadelphia is served by the Philadelphia Public School District. A portion is zoned to the Neshoba County School District.

Media
The Neshoba Democrat is published in Philadelphia. It is a weekly newspaper that was established in 1881.

Infrastructure

Public utilities
Cable television services for the city of Philadelphia are contracted to MetroCast Communications.  Electrical utilities, as well as water and sewer service, are provided by the City of Philadelphia as Philadelphia Utilities.  The natural gas utility is CenterPoint Energy. AT&T is the local telephone service provider.

Notable people
Adam Monroe Byrd, U.S. Congressman and practicing lawyer in Philadelphia, Mississippi
Billy Cannon, college and pro football player, 1959 Heisman Trophy winner
Turner Catledge, former editor-in-chief for the Chicago Sun
Marcus Dupree, football player in NFL and USFL, also known for building the Mount Nebo Baptist Church in Philadelphia; subject of "The Best That Never Was", an episode in ESPN's 30 for 30 series
Bob Ferguson, RCA Victor  record producer and songwriter, known for his song "On the Wings of a Dove" that was recorded first by Ferlin Husky in the early 1960s
Stan Frazier, professional wrestler better known as Uncle Elmer
Michael Wilson Hardy, country music singer-songwriter and goes by the name Hardy
Iris Kelso, journalist
Phillip Martin, Chief of the Mississippi Band of Choctaw Indians
Fred McAfee, player for New Orleans Saints and Pittsburgh Steelers, Director of Player Development for Saints
Joe H. Mulholland, lawyer and Mississippi state senator
Lallah Miles Perry, painter and artist
Clayton Rand, journalist and author
Earl S. Richardson, longtime Mississippi state legislator
Otis Rush, musician in Blues Hall of Fame
Marty Stuart, country music entertainer and Grand Ole Opry star

References

External links

 Official webpage for the City of Philadelphia

 
Cities in Mississippi
Cities in Neshoba County, Mississippi
County seats in Mississippi